The Lester-MG T51, also known as the MG Special, the Lester T51, or the MG T51, is a sports race car, designed, developed and built by Harry Lester, and based on the MG TC, between 1949 and 1954. Only 18 models were produced, and only 4 cars are known to have survived.

References

Sports racing cars
Grand tourer racing cars
1950s cars
Cars of England